Santiago is a town and municipality located in the Putumayo Department, Republic of Colombia. It is the birthplace of Inga painter, Carlos Jacanamijoy.

External links
 Santiago official website
 Cityhall of Santiago

References

Municipalities of Putumayo Department